Kuralarasan is an Indian actor and composer who works in Tamil-language films. He has collaborated with his father, T. Rajendar, and his brother, Silambarasan, in all his films to date.

Personal life 
Kuralarasan is the younger son of T. Rajendar and Usha, and younger brother of Silambarasan.

In February 2019, Kuralarasan's video of shahada (proclamation of faith) embracing Islam with the presence of his parents in a Masjid in Annasalai, Chennai had become viral. Rajender in the press interview stated that Kuralarasan since young years had been passionate about Islam and completely embraced Islam through that proclamation event. Kuralarasan stated that out of his own will being attracted to the principles of Islam had embraced it.

Career 
He began his career as a child artist and garnered acclaim for his role in Sonnal Thaan Kaadhala (2001). He made his debut as a music composer with his father's production Idhu Namma Aalu (2016) starring his brother, Silambarasan. He wrote the lyrics for all the songs in addition to rendering his voice for the song "King Kong". He went on to compose an independent album with US-based artists and is working on several Hindi films.

Filmography

As an actor

As music composer

References

External links 

Male actors in Tamil cinema
Tamil male actors
Tamil film score composers
Living people
Year of birth missing (living people)
Converts to Islam
Islam in Tamil Nadu